Kraken I + II is the name of a studio album Collection Colombian group Kraken  It was released on February 3, 1994 by Codiscos.

Information 
This album brings a total of twelve songs from the first two albums, including "Vestido de Cristal" (Crystal Dress), "No me hablas de amor" (Do Not Speak of Love), "Todo hombre es una historia" (Every Man is a Story) and "Escudo y Espada" (Shield and Sword).

Track listing

References 

Kraken (band) albums
1994 albums